The Baneh clash was a military confrontation between Iranian security forces belonging to the Basij, the paramilitary branch of the Islamic Revolutionary Guard Corps (IRGC) and Kurdistan Free Life Party (PJAK) militants which occurred on December 28, 2011. 

According to Iranian media outlets Fars News and Press TV, at least five people were killed during the clash, including one Basiji and four members of the PJAK, adding that several PJAK members had been injured. PJAK, however claims to have killed nine government forces during the clash while sustaining no casualties themselves.

The PJAK claims that through this attack Iranian forces had violated the terms of a cease-fire between the two sides, releasing the following statement on their website on January 4: "This military operation and attack by the Islamic Republic occurs even though, since September 5, both sides had declared a ceasefire, which we have not violated."

See also
Iranian Kurdistan

References

2011 in Iran
Battles involving Iran
Conflicts in 2011
Iran–PJAK conflict
December 2011 events in Iran
Battles in 2011